The Bobby Hopper Tunnel is a highway tunnel on Interstate 49 (I-49) in Arkansas, just north of the Crawford—Washington county line. It opened in 1999 to four lanes of traffic. No toll is charged.

Description
A prominent feature of the tunnel is the noticeably inclined gradient of each bore and its associated roadway. Southbound traffic experiences a significant descending gradient inside the tunnel, while northbound traffic experiences a corresponding ascending gradient. Cross-passages occur every  allowing for five emergency ways in. Besides paved openings, the tunnel has traffic signals, lighting, message signs, carbon monoxide monitors, fire protection, and closed-circuit television systems to monitor traffic remotely at the Fort Smith highway department district headquarters.

The tunnel was named for the director of the Arkansas Highway Commission (a resident of nearby Springdale, Arkansas) during the time of its construction. This is the only highway tunnel in the state of Arkansas; there are seven railroad tunnels but only one highway tunnel in the state.

History
U.S. Route 71 (US 71), once classified as "one of the most dangerous highways in America", includes a perilous stretch between Alma and Fayetteville through the Ozark Plateau. Thus, construction of an alternate route was designed to make the trip safer, as well as reducing travel time. Approved in 1987 and completed in 1999, at a cost of $458 million, the alternate route, I-540, eventually renamed I-49, had an obstacle of an unnamed  peak just north of the Washington—Crawford county line, in what John Haman of Arkansas Business called "smack in the middle of motoring wilderness." A tunnel feasibility study was awarded to Garver USA, which subcontracted with Sverdrup Corporation of Maryland Heights, Missouri, and TapanAm Associates, Inc., of Kansas City, Missouri, to determine the best option—a tunnel. The alternative would disfigure the topography and necessitate a  cut creating  of debris to be disposed, as it was not usable within the project.

Blasting, drilling, and excavation removed native shale and sandstone rocks, slowly chipping to the desired width and length. The hollowed-out channel was lined with reinforced concrete, as were both openings.

References

External links
Image of South Portals of the Bobby Hopper Tunnel

Tunnels in Arkansas
Buildings and structures in Washington County, Arkansas
Transportation in Washington County, Arkansas
Tunnels completed in 1998
Interstate 49
Road tunnels in the United States